Varvara Gracheva was the defending champion but chose not to participate.

Kristina Mladenovic won the title, defeating Camilla Rosatello in the final, 6–4, 4–6, 7–6(7–3).

Seeds

Draw

Finals

Top half

Bottom half

References

External links
Main Draw

Internazionali Femminili di Tennis Città di Caserta - Singles